Kosmos 265 ( meaning Cosmos 265), known before launch as DS-P1-Yu No.21, was a Soviet satellite which was used as a radar calibration target for tests of anti-ballistic missiles. It was built by the Yuzhnoye Design Bureau, and launched in 1969 as part of the Dnepropetrovsk Sputnik programme.

Kosmos 265 was launched from Plesetsk Cosmodrome Site 133/1, atop a Kosmos-2I 63SM carrier rocket. The launch occurred on 7 February 1969 at 13:59 UTC, and resulted in Kosmos 265's successful deployment into low Earth orbit. Upon reaching orbit, it was assigned its Kosmos designation, and received the International Designator 1969-012A.

It remained in orbit until it decayed and reentered the atmosphere on 1 May 1969. It was the eighteenth of seventy nine DS-P1-Yu satellites to be launched, and the seventeenth of seventy two to successfully reach orbit.

See also 

 1969 in spaceflight

References 

Spacecraft launched in 1969
Kosmos satellites
Dnepropetrovsk Sputnik program